Nikolay Nikolaevich Strizhkov (born 22 February 1990) is a Belarusian former footballer who is last known to have played as a midfielder for Uzda.

Career

In 2014, Strizhkov signed for Cypriot side Ayia Napa from Alfa (Minsk) in the Belarusian third division, but left due to financial problems.

Before the 2017 season, he signed for Belarusian second division club Energetik-BGU.

References

External links

 

Belarusian footballers
Living people
1990 births
Expatriate footballers in Cyprus
Ayia Napa FC players
Belarusian First League players
Association football midfielders
Belarusian expatriate footballers
FC Uzda players
FC Energetik-BGU Minsk players
FC Smolevichi players
FC Veras Nesvizh players
FC Klechesk Kletsk players
FC Kommunalnik Slonim players